Manuel Hauzinger (born 3 December 1982, in Vienna, Austria) is a former motorcycle speedway rider from Austria. He is a eight times champion of Austria.

Career
He rode in the United Kingdom for the Berwick Bandits in the Premier League. He also rode for the Swindon Robins in the Elite League, replacing Theo Pijper. He made a memorable debut for Swindon against the Eastbourne Eagles, where he scored 8 points and beat Grand Prix star Scott Nicholls.

Hauzinger has won the Austrian National Championship eight times (2002, 2004, 2005, 2006, 2007, 2008, 2009 and 2010) and represented Austria in the 2004 Speedway World Cup. He also won the 2007 Argentine Championship.

Honours 
Speedway World Cup (Team World Championship):
2004 - 4th place in Qualifying Round 2 (6 points)
Individual European Championship:
2007 - 9th place (7 points)
2008 - not rode in Semi-Final 1
European Pairs Championship:
2004 - 4th place in Semi-Final 1 (6 points)
2007 - 6th place (12 points)
European Club Champions' Cup:
2004 - 5th place (1 point)
2007 - 2nd place in Semi-Final 1 (18 points)
Hungarian Championship
2001 - 14th place (5 points)
2003 - 14th place (16 points)
2004 - 5th place (57 points)
2005 - 18th place (6 points)
2011 - 8th place (14 points)

See also 
 Austria national speedway team

References 

1982 births
Living people
Austrian speedway riders
Birmingham Brummies riders
Isle of Wight Islanders riders
Newcastle Diamonds riders
Sportspeople from Vienna